Manaus Monorail is a  straddle monorail planned for construction in the Brazilian city of Manaus. In February 2012, the Infrastructure Secretariat of Amazonas signed a contract with a consortium of CR Almedia, Mendes Junior, Serveng and Malaysian rail company Scomi Rail for the construction of the monorail. , construction has yet to begin.

History
Announced in August 2011, the line would run from Largo da Matriz to Jorge Teixeira, serving nine stations. It is designed to carry up to 35 000 passengers/h per direction. Completion was scheduled for 2014, though it has been delayed. Scomi Rail will supply 10 six-car SUTRA trainsets and depot equipment, as well as track switches, a maintenance vehicle, system integration and project management.

Route

References

Rapid transit in Brazil
Manaus
Monorails